Martina Navratilova was the defending champion but did not compete that year.

Steffi Graf won in the final 6–2, 6–2 against Mary Pierce.

Seeds
A champion seed is indicated in bold text while text in italics indicates the round in which that seed was eliminated. The top four seeds received a bye to the second round.

  Steffi Graf (champion)
  Mary Pierce (final)
  Jana Novotná (semifinals)
  Iva Majoli (semifinals)
  Julie Halard (second round)
  Judith Wiesner (quarterfinals)
  Karina Habšudová (quarterfinals)
  Sabine Appelmans (quarterfinals)

Draw

Final

Section 1

Section 2

External links
 ITF tournament edition profile
 Tournament draws

Open GDF Suez
1995 WTA Tour